Jurijus Veklenko (born 6 July 1990 in Klaipėda), also known as Jurij Veklenko or simply Jurijus, is a Lithuanian singer.

Eurovision Song Contest
Veklenko previously performed at the Eurovision Song Contest 2015 as one of the backing singers for Monika Linkytė and Vaidas Baumila in their performance of "This Time"; along with the three other backing singers, Jurijus took part in a same-sex kiss as part of the final performance.

In 2017, Veklenko performed the main vocal for lip-sync drag-act Lolita Zero, in her Lithuanian national final entry "Get Frighten".

Veklenko won the 2019 Lithuanian national final with the song "Run with the Lions", and represented his country at the Eurovision Song Contest 2019 in Tel Aviv.

Personal life
Veklenko works for a major engineering firm mainly with IT and has said he enjoys the contrast with his musical career. He is of Ukrainian descent.

Discography

Studio albums

Singles

References

Living people
1990 births
21st-century Lithuanian male singers
Eurovision Song Contest entrants for Lithuania
Eurovision Song Contest entrants of 2019
Lithuanian people of Ukrainian descent
Musicians from Vilnius
Musicians from Klaipėda
Lithuanian pop singers
Klaipėda University alumni